Live in América is a live album by Paco de Lucía Sextet, the band formed by famous flamenco guitarist Paco de Lucía.

Track listing
 "Mi Niño Curro (Rondeña)" – 8:31
 "La Barrosa (Alegría)" – 4:56
 "Alcázar de Sevilla (Bulería)" – 8:54
 "Peroche (Tanguillos)" – 6:28
 "Tío Sabas (Taranta)" – 6:34
 "Soniquete (Bulería)" – 6:49
 "Zyryab" – 12:53
 "Buana Buana King Kong (Rumba)" – 5:14

Musicians
 Paco de Lucía - Flamenco guitar
 Ramón de Algeciras - Flamenco guitar
 Rafael Sánchez de vargas, guitar
 Carles Benavent - Bass guitar
 Pepe de Lucía - Vocals, Rhythm guitar
 Jorge Pardo - Flute, Soprano saxophone
 Rubem Dantas - Percussion
 Manolo Soler - Percussion

References

 Gamboa, Manuel José and Nuñez, Faustino. (2003). Paco de Lucía. Madrid:Universal Music Spain.

Paco de Lucía live albums
1993 live albums